Amblyaspis is a genus of parasitoid wasps belonging to the family Platygastridae.

The genus was described in 1856 by Förster.

The genus has cosmopolitan distribution.

Species:
 Amblyaspis belus
 Amblyaspis ctesias (Walker, 1839)
 Amblyaspis flavibrunneus Dodd, 1924
 Amblyaspis prorsa
 Amblyaspis roboris
 Amblyaspis scelionoides
 Amblyaspis tritici

References

Platygastridae
Hymenoptera genera